Tahith Jose Girigorio Djorkaef Chong (born 4 December 1999) is a Dutch professional footballer who plays as a winger for  club Birmingham City.

Chong joined the Manchester United Academy aged 16, after progressing through the Feyenoord youth system. He won both the Jimmy Murphy Young Player of the Year and  Denzil Haroun Reserve Player of the Year awards at United. He made his professional debut in 2019, in an FA Cup game against Reading. In August 2020, he joined Werder Bremen on a season-long loan, which was cut short in January 2021 to facilitate a loan move to Club Brugge. He spent the 2021–22 season on loan at Birmingham City and then joined the club permanently in September 2022. 

Chong made more than 40 appearances for the Netherlands national youth teams from under-15 to under-21 level. He is also eligible to represent Curaçao at international level.

Early life
Chong was born in Willemstad, Curaçao which was then part of the Netherlands Antilles. He is of African and Chinese descent. He later moved to Rotterdam, Netherlands, in order to pursue a move to a professional club. Upon completing a move to Manchester United, Chong's parents also moved to England.

Club career

Early career
Chong joined the youth ranks of Eredivisie club Feyenoord aged 10, and had attracted interest from several Premier League clubs by the age of 16. In September 2014, Chong took part in the Manchester Premier Cup at the Carrington Training Ground, where he was spotted by Manchester United scouts. In early 2016, Chong was on the verge of joining Chelsea.

Manchester United

Youth
In April 2016, Chong announced that he was to join Manchester United after Feyenoord failed to "make a plan" for him. The transfer was made official three months later upon receiving international clearance. Initially linking up with the Under-18s, Chong scored his club's only goal of their 2016–17 FA Youth Cup campaign as they suffered a third round exit to Southampton. The following month, he was ruled out for the remainder of the season after suffering a cruciate ligament injury. Making his return 10 months later for the Under-23s, Chong went on to be named the Jimmy Murphy Young Player of the Year in May 2018.

Senior
In July 2018, Chong was called up to the first team for their pre-season tour in the United States. In their opening game, he featured as a second-half substitute in a 1–1 draw against Club América, followed by starting in their goalless draw against the San Jose Earthquakes. On 23 October, he was named as an unused substitute for the first time in United's 1–0 defeat to Juventus in the Champions League. Following the appointment of Ole Gunnar Solskjær as caretaker manager, Chong made his competitive debut replacing Juan Mata in a 2–0 FA Cup victory against Reading on 5 January. At the end of the season, he was named the Denzil Haroun Reserve Player of the Year award, becaming the first player since Giuseppe Rossi to win the award the year after being named the Jimmy Murphy Young Player of the Year. On 9 March 2020, Chong signed a new contract to keep him at the club until 2022, with the option to extend a further year.

Werder Bremen and Club Brugge loans
On 16 August 2020, Chong joined Bundesliga club Werder Bremen on a season-long loan. On 12 September, he scored his first goal in his first competitive match for Werder Bremen against FC Carl Zeiss Jena in the DFB-Pokal. Chong's loan was cut short in January 2021. Chong joined Belgian First Division A club Club Brugge on loan on 30 January, and scored on his debut four days later in a Belgian Cup game against Olsa Brakel.

Birmingham City (loan)
On 9 July 2021, Chong joined Birmingham City on a season-long loan. However, he spent pre-season ahead of the 2021–22 campaign at his parent club, and joined Birmingham in time for the start of the Championship season. He made his debut for Birmingham in a 1–0 win over Sheffield United on 7 August, and two weeks later, he made two assists in a 5–0 win over Luton Town. On 2 November 2021, Chong returned to Manchester United for his rehabilitation following surgery on a serious groin injury. He returned to Birmingham in February 2022, and two minutes into his first start after his return, away to Bristol City, he opened the scoring in a 2–1 win; it was his only goal for the club. He lasted another month before a hamstring injury kept him out until the last match of the season.

Birmingham City
On 1 September 2022, Chong signed a four-year contract with Birmingham City for an undisclosed fee.

International career
Chong played youth international football for the Netherlands at under-15, under-16, under-17, under-19, under-20 and under-21 levels. He represented the under-17 national team at the 2016 UEFA European Under-17 Championship and scored the only goal in the quarter-final victory against Sweden.

In June 2021, Chong accepted a call-up to the Curaçao national team for their 2021 CONCACAF Gold Cup preliminary squad. However, he was not included in the final squad, which subsequently withdrew from the tournament due to an outbreak of COVID-19.

Career statistics

Honours
Club Brugge
 Belgian First Division A: 2020–21

Individual
UEFA European Under-17 Championship Team of the Tournament: 2016
Jimmy Murphy Young Player of the Year: 2017–18
Denzil Haroun Reserve Player of the Year: 2018–19
Premier League 2 Player of the Month: December 2019

References

External links

 Profile at ManUtd.com
 Ons Oranje U21 Profile

1999 births
Living people
People from Willemstad
Dutch footballers
Curaçao footballers
Netherlands under-21 international footballers
Netherlands youth international footballers
Association football wingers
Manchester United F.C. players
SV Werder Bremen players
Club Brugge KV players
Birmingham City F.C. players
Premier League players
Bundesliga players
Belgian Pro League players
English Football League players
Dutch people of Curaçao descent
Dutch people of Chinese descent
Curaçao people of Chinese descent
Sportspeople of Chinese descent
Dutch expatriate footballers
Expatriate footballers in Belgium
Expatriate footballers in England
Expatriate footballers in Germany
Dutch expatriate sportspeople in Belgium
Dutch expatriate sportspeople in England
Dutch expatriate sportspeople in Germany